Yu or YU may refer to:

Arts and entertainment

Music
 Yu (wind instrument), an ancient Chinese free-reed mouth organ, larger than the sheng
 Yu (percussion instrument), an ancient Chinese musical instrument in a shape of a tiger with a serrated back or/and front

Other media
 Yu (film), a 2003 Austrian film
 Yu-Gi-Oh!, a Japanese manga series
 YuYu Hakusho, a Japanese manga series
 Yu (Stargate), a System Lord from the science fiction series Stargate SG-1
 Yu Narukami, a character from the video game Persona 4

Businesses and organizations

Universities
 Yale University, New Haven, United States
 Al-Yamamah Private University, Riyadh, Saudi Arabia
 Yamagata University, Yamagata, Japan
 Yarmouk University, Irbid, Jordan
 Yeshiva University, New York City, United States
 Yeungnam University, Gyeongsang, South Korea
 Yonsei University, Seoul, South Korea
 York University, Toronto, Canada

Other businesses and organizations
 YU Televentures, an Indian mobile handset manufacturer
 Youth United, an Indian organization in Delhi, Chandigarh, Patiala and Bangalore
 Youth Unlimited, a youth ministry in Canada and the United States
 YU, the IATA code for EuroAtlantic Airways

Letters
 U, in English
 Yu (Cyrillic), in the Cyrillic alphabet (Ю)
 Yu (kana), romanisation of the Japanese ゆ and ユ

Names and people

 Yu (Chinese surname) (/, /, /)
 List of people with surname Yu
 Yū, a Japanese given name, including variants Yu, Yuu, and Yui
 Yu the Great ( or ) (2200–2100 BC), founder of the Xia dynasty
 Huduershidaogao (34 BC-AD 46), born Yu, Xiongnu chanyu.
 Yu People, an ethnic group in ancient China
 Yoo (Korean surname), a common Korean family name
 You (surname), transliteration of several Chinese surnames, spelled Yu in the Wade–Giles romanization system

Places

In China
 Chongqing, officially abbreviated to Yú
 Henan, officially abbreviated to Yù
Yu opera, Chinese opera of Henan
 Yü (region), geographic division of Tibet
 Yu County, Hebei
 Yu County, Shanxi
 Yu (Chinese state), an ancient duchy in what is today China overthrown by Duke Xian of Jin
 Yu River (Guangxi), China
 Yu River (Ningxia), China

Other places
 Yugoslavia:
 Socialist Federal Republic of Yugoslavia (old ISO country code and derived ccTLD .yu)
 Federal Republic of Yugoslavia (old ISO country code and derived ccTLD .yu)
 Yu, a village in Pate, Cambodia
 Yu (Vychegda), a river in Komi Republic, Russia

Other
 Yu, a transparent rice wine from Manipur

See also
 Ye (disambiguation)
 You (disambiguation)